Dok čekaš sabah sa šejtanom is the second studio album by Yugoslav band Zabranjeno Pušenje released on June 11, 1985. It was released through Jugoton in SFR Yugoslavia. It is the band's first double album.

Following the unexpected success of their debut album Das ist Walter (which sold more than 100,000 copies), the band's sophomore studio effort was somewhat of a commercial disappointment, selling just over 30,000 copies in Yugoslavia.

The album was re-released in 2000 by Croatia Records.

Background 
During the Das ist Walter promotional tour, at their concert in Rijeka on November 27, 1984, Nele Karajlić declared, referring to an amplifier that had just broken down, "Crk'o Maršal. Mislim na pojačalo.", which was recognized as a pun on Marshal Tito's death, landing the band in trouble. They were criticized by the media and a campaign against them resulted in the canceling of their concerts and the removal of Top lista nadrealista from the air. The affair got attention of the Yugoslav Security Administration (UDBA), as well. They were rescued by some leading liberal intellectuals, and magazines such as Polet, Mladina and Slobodna Dalmacija, who raise their voices in the defense of the group members and that affair snaps without prison sentences.

In this atmosphere, the band recorded their this double album Dok čekaš sabah sa šejtanom in the infamous SIM studio and released it in July 1985. The album has received widespread acclaim from critics, but was boycotted by the media.

Promotional tour  
The promotional tour had extreme difficulties due to concern of the concert hosts and the enormous presence of the state police, as a reflection of the Marshall Affair. Despite several top concerts such as at Pionir Hall in Belgrade, Poljud in Split or Dom Sportova in Zagreb, tens of thousands sold tickets, the tour had a rather disappointing conclusion as the following year Šeki Gayton and Mustafa Čengić left the band in search of a more secure means of making a living. Mladen Mitić left in late 1986 after contributing to the development of the third album.

Track listing
Source: Discogs

Personnel
Credits adapted from the album's liner notes.

Zabranjeno pušenje
 Mladen Mitić Munja  – bass, backing vocals
 Predrag Rakić Šeki – drums
 Mustafa Čengić Mujo – solo guitar, backing vocals
 Ognjen Gajić – saxophone, flute, keyboards 
 Zenit Đozić – congas, backing vocals
 Sejo Sexon – rhythm guitar
 Nele Karajlić – lead vocals
 Dražen Janković (credited as Seid Karajlić) – keyboards

Additional musicians
 Stanko Juzbašić – synthesizer (tracks B6, D4)
 Senad Galijašević (credited as Senad od Bosne) – backing vocals (tracks B6, D4)

Production
 Mahmut Paša Ferović – production
 Vladimir Smolec – sound engineering
 Dragan Čačinović Čač – recording

Design
 Srđan Velimirović – design
 Elvedin Kantardžić – photos

References

1985 albums
Zabranjeno Pušenje albums